Crellin is an unincorporated community and census-designated place (CDP) in Garrett County, Maryland, United States, with a population of 264 as of the 2010 census. Crellin Elementary School is located in the community, notable for winning the U.S. Green School Award of 2007.

Crellin was built as a company town, having been home to a large coal mining and lumber operation at the turn of the 20th century. The Preston Railroad, which had been named for Preston County, West Virginia, which the railroad crossed into several times along its route, was also headquartered in Crellin, but closed down in the late 1950s. While the town survives today, very little remains to show that the original lumbering, mining, and railroad operations ever existed.

The community is in the valley of the Youghiogheny River and is built into a loop of Snowy Creek where the creek joins the Youghiogheny. Maryland Route 39 (Hutton Road) leads east  to Oakland, the Garrett County seat, and northwest  to Corinth, West Virginia.

Demographics

References

Census-designated places in Garrett County, Maryland
Census-designated places in Maryland
Coal towns in Maryland